Predić is a Serbian surname. It may refer to:

Uroš Predić (1857-1953), Yugoslav-Serbian painter
Uroš Predić (born 1973), retired footballer

See also
Predojević

Serbian surnames